Events from the year 1997 in Romania.

Incumbents 

 President of Romania: Emil Constantinescu
 Prime Minister of Romania: Victor Ciorbea

Events

January 
 10 January – Miron Cozma is arrested.

February 
 February – The Government of Romania revokes a 1948 communist decree that had annulled Michael I of Romania's Romanian citizenship, thus restoring it to him.
 21-22 February – President of France, Jacques Chirac, visits Romania.
 28 February – Michael I of Romania arrives at Henri Coandă International Airport at 13:00 local time with a fully restored Romanian citizenship, during a 6-day tour throughout the country.

July 

 11 July – President of the United States, Bill Clinton, visits Romania.

December 
 2 December – Prime Minister Victor Ciorbea announces at a press conference, at 18:00 local time, the names of the ministers who are to be changed in a cabinet reshuffle of the Ciorbea Cabinet.
 4 December – The reshuffled Ciorbea Cabinet is approved by the parliament with 277 votes in favour out 486 total possible votes. There were 85 absentees at the vote.
 5 December – The reshuffled Ciorbea Cabinet takes its oath into office in front of president Emil Constantinescu.

See also

References

External links